Diego Mauricio Enríquez Gutiérrez (born 24 January 2002) is a Peruvian footballer who plays as a goalkeeper for UTC, on loan from Sporting Cristal.

Career statistics

Club

Notes

References

2002 births
Living people
Peruvian footballers
Peru youth international footballers
Association football goalkeepers
Peruvian Primera División players
Sporting Cristal footballers
Cienciano footballers
Cusco FC footballers
Universidad Técnica de Cajamarca footballers